Pedro Moura Costa (born 1963, in Brazil) is an entrepreneur involved in environmental finance with a focus on the international efforts for greenhouse gas (GHG) emission reductions. Of particular relevance, he was the founder and President of EcoSecurities Group Plc., one of the leading project developers for the international carbon markets, and has written widely about the policy and science of climate change mitigation, including contributions to the Intergovernmental Panel on Climate Change (IPCC) reports.

Role in Pre-Kyoto carbon emission reduction initiatives 

Moura Costa's involvement with the carbon emission reduction sector started in 1991, with the development of two of the first carbon forestry projects worldwide, namely the Innoprise-Face Foundation Rainforest Rehabilitation Project and the Innoprise-New England Power Reduced Impact Logging Project, both in Sabah, Malaysia. Moura Costa served as Senior Project Officer for Innoprise between 1991 and 1995, involved with both these projects.

While the concept of ‘joint implementation’ of greenhouse gas (GHG) emission reduction projects (also called "carbon offset projects") was launched at the United Nations Conference on Environment and Development (UNCED, “the Earth Summit”), the early carbon offset projects of the 1990s suffered from a lack of specialised services to support them. One service of particular importance is that of independent verification of carbon offsets, as offsets are dependent on proving a shift of behaviour in relation to a baseline (this shift is referred as "additionality", in the sector).

Moura Costa identified the absence of independent verification services as one of the limiting factors to the growth of the carbon market at that time, and in 1996 he developed the first carbon offset verification service worldwide, which was licensed to the Swiss certification company SGS (Société Générale de Surveillance). The first client for this certification service was the Costa Rican National GHG Mitigation Programme, developed by OCIC (Costa Rican Office on Joint Implementation). After the launch of the Kyoto Protocol (see below), independent certification of carbon emission reductions became a mandatory requirement under the rules of the Clean Development Mechanism (i.e., the carbon credits of this mechanism are called CERs, meaning Certified Emission Reductions).

To pursue the work with SGS and the government of Costa Rica, Moura Costa created EcoSecurities, a company specialised in the development of greenhouse gas mitigation projects.

Contribution to the CDM and carbon trading 

EcoSecurities was founded in January 1997 by Moura Costa and environmental economist Marc Stuart to provide "environmental finance solutions". Twelve months later, in December 1997 the Kyoto Protocol was signed creating binding commitments for reductions in greenhouse gas emissions among industrialised countries. It also created the Flexibility Mechanisms, Joint Implementation and the Clean Development Mechanism (CDM), that enabled the creation and use of carbon credits from greenhouse gas emission reduction projects. Carbon trading gradually evolved from being a niche environmental activity to becoming a global market that in 2010 mobilised over €120 billion, including trades under the European Union Emissions Trading Scheme and the UN flexibility mechanisms.

As carbon markets evolved, Moura Costa was particularly interested in making investors and analysts incorporate the impact of greenhouse gas emissions on company valuations. In 1999, he co-ordinated the development of the carbon trading component of Australian Plantation Timber, a forestry investment fund, the first time ‘carbon value’ was included in an investment prospectus. Gradually, investor awareness of climate and environmental issues increased, and as a result of that (and contributing to this trend) a series of companies in the carbon market sector floated on stock exchanges in 2004–2006.

The adoption of binding emission reduction commitments by the Kyoto Protocol created a positive environment for more carbon offset project development companies to be created worldwide.  Benefitting from an early mover advantage, EcoSecurities rapidly expanded and established a significant market share. In December 2005, EcoSecurities listed on the London Stock Exchange (AIM) raising capital for its expansion, one of the first companies in this sector to be listed. As President and COO, Moura Costa coordinated the expansion of the company, from 30 to 300 employees, establishing the firm's offices in 28 countries worldwide. In 2007, the company raised a second round of capital from the stock markets, and attracted Credit Suisse as a strategic partner.

During the period he was involved with EcoSecurities, from 1997 to 2009, the company developed more than 450 CDM projects in over 40 countries and, between them, using over 20 different technologies. The company was a pioneer in many aspects of the sector, including the development of the first project registered by the CDM (the NovaGerar landfill project in Brazil), and the first project to receive CERs (a small-hydro project in Honduras). With a view to broadening its reach, he led the company to develop new divisions focused on specialised technologies related to greenhouse gas abatement.  Among them, EcoMethane, a division specialised in the creation of projects for the collection and destruction of methane from landfill sites, and a division for the development of N2O abatement projects, focusing on nitric acid factories. Moura Costa was also the fund manager of the EcoSecurities-Standard Bank Carbon Facility, which invested in projects on behalf of the Government of Denmark and, subsequently, EcoSecurities also run similar funds on behalf of the governments of Austria and Japan.

In April 2009, Moura Costa resigned from EcoSecurities to conduct a take-over bid to acquire control of the company, together with Brazilian investment group BTG. This resulted in an international competition for the acquisition of the company and in October 2009 EcoSecurities was acquired by JP Morgan.

Creation of BVRio Environmental Exchange in Brazil 

In 2011, Pedro and his brother Mauricio Moura Costa founded BVRio Environmental Exchange (Bolsa Verde do Rio de Janeiro), an organisation based in Rio de Janeiro, Brazil, with the mission to develop market mechanisms to facilitate compliance with environmental laws. BVRio was developed in partnership with the Rio de Janeiro State Government, and the Municipality of Rio de Janeiro and its board includes the participation of Funbio (Brazilian Fund for the Biodiversity), FBDS (Brazilian Foundation for Sustainable Development), and CEBDS (the Brazilian chapter of the World Business Council for Sustainable Development).

Through BVRio, Pedro has helped to create markets for different environmental assets including Forest Legal Reserve Credits, Consolidation of Conservation Areas, and Reforestation Credits to support compliance with the new Brazilian Forest Law; Reverse Logistics Credits to support the implementation of the Brazilian National Solid Waste Legislation; and traceable responsible commodities, to promote the sourcing of legal and/or sustainably produced forest and agricultural products.

In recognition for its role in developing innovative mechanisms for environmental objectives, BVRio won the 2013 Katerva Awards and in 2014 BVRio was nominated a "Climate Action Leader" by the R20 Regions of Climate Action.

Contribution to environmental policy and science 

Dr Moura Costa has a PhD from University of London and has published widely in the subjects of environmental finance, carbon trading, GHG mitigation science and forestry. In particular, many of his articles have focused on scientific aspects of the design of the Clean Development Mechanism, such as discussions on leakage, additionality, monitoring and verification, permanence, and carbon forestry. He was also a Lead Author to the IPCC Special Report on Land Use, Land-Use Change and Forestry and other IPCC reports (the work of the IPCC, including the contributions of many scientists, was recognised by the joint award of the 2007 Nobel Peace Prize). He has also written on forestry, low impact logging, and innovative financial mechanisms for the environment.

His work has been covered widely by the international media, including cover features in the Wall Street Journal,  Director Magazine, Future Fuels, articles in Fortune Magazine, Sunday Times, Forbes, Estado de São Paulo, and TV and radio interviews with TV Globo, BBC and others. Moura Costa is regular speaker in conferences and universities, promoting innovative solutions for environmental challenges, including climate change mitigation and adaptation, pollution control, and forest protection. Between 1995 and 2005 he frequently lectured at Oxford University and Imperial College of London.

In 2007, Moura Costa organized the international conference Rio+15, to celebrate 15 years of the UN Conference on Environment and Development (the ‘Earth Summit’).  The conference had the participation of over 200 international participants, including introductions by Maurice Strong (organiser of the Earth Summit) and former Brazilian president Fernando Henrique Cardoso, and received wide media coverage.

Moura Costa is a member of the advisory boards of Oxford Climate Policy, the ClimateBonds Initiative, the Brazilian Rural Society (Conselho de Meio Ambiente, Sociedade Rural Brasileira), and the Businesses for Climate (Empresas pelo Clima) initiative, and was formerly a board member of the International Institute for Sustainable Development.

References 

1963 births
Living people
Brazilian businesspeople